She's About a Mover is a 1965 song by the Sir Douglas Quintet that was quickly covered by several other artists. The song has a 12-bar blues structure, and is structured in a similar manner to The Beatles' "She's a Woman", Holland–Dozier–Holland's "Can I Get a Witness" , Ray Charles' "What'd I Say" and Bobby Parker's "Watch Your Step".

This was one of the many hits recorded at a location that was known in the 1960s as Gold Star Studios (which is not the same as the LA studio of the same name); it   later became known as SugarHill Recording Studios and was located in Houston, Texas. Other hits recorded in the "She's About a Mover" studio included "Treat Her Right" by Roy Head & the Traits, "Funny" by Joe Hinton, and "Turn On Your Love Light" by Bobby "Blue" Bland.

"She's About a Mover" was named the #1 Texas song by Texas Monthly, also charting at #15 on the UK Singles Chart. With a Vox Continental organ riff provided by Augie Meyers and a soulful vocal by lead singer-guitarist Doug Sahm, the track has a Tex-Mex sound. The regional smash became a breakaway hit, and the recording was used in the soundtracks of the films Echo Park (1986), American Boyfriends (1989), The Doors (1991), Riding in Cars with Boys (2001), Sorority Boys (2002), and Beautiful Darling (2010).

In 1983, the song appeared on Ringo Starr's ninth album Old Wave.

References

1965 songs
1983 songs
Ringo Starr songs
London Records singles